PegLeg is a video game developed by High Risk Ventures and published by Changeling Software for the Macintosh.

Gameplay

PegLeg is a shoot-'em-up.

Development
PegLeg was released for Mac computers in August 1994.

Reception

Next Generations reviewer stated, "If you've got work to do, better stay away from this game." MacAddict named PegLeg one of the Macintosh's essential titles, and the magazine's Kathy Tafel wrote, "If you ever happen to visit us here at MacAddict, take a look at our receptionist's Mac. Chances are, you'll find it running PegLeg". Writing in The Macintosh Bible, Bart Farkas praised the game and said that it "will have you playing for hours—and will inflict serious damage on your trigger finger if you're not careful."

Macworld awarded PegLeg its 1995 "Best Shoot-'em-up" prize. The magazine's Steven Levy called it "compulsively seductive even to a jaded alien-blaster with an arthritic trigger finger".

References

External links
 http://www.ign.com/games/peg-leg

Classic Mac OS games